Horologica bicolor is a species of sea snail, a gastropod in the family Cerithiopsidae. It was described by Laseron, in 1956.

References

Cerithiopsidae
Gastropods described in 1956